is a pinball video game for Nintendo's Virtual Boy game console. The game was released on July 21, 1995 in Japan and on August 14, 1995 in the United States. It is set in the Milky Way galaxy, and has players maneuvering a puck around one of four pinball tables available in the game. The Virtual Boy's standard red-and-black color scheme resulted in criticism of this and other games on the platform for causing nausea, headaches, and eye strain. It also uses parallax, which allows the game to display three-dimensional effects. It has received a mixed reception; it was praised for its authenticity, while reception to its physics and controls were mixed. It has also received criticism for its lack of ambition and originality.

Gameplay and premise

Galactic Pinball is set in the Milky Way galaxy, and tells the story of the discovery of a new, strange world. At the Title Screen, players can choose from four pinball tables: Cosmic, Colony, UFO, and Alien. Players can also choose to look at the top scores. The Cosmic table features a cameo from Metroid where players control protagonist Samus Aran's ship. Players are given five pucks, which players must keep going by using the flippers to hit it upward. The goal is to accumulate points and avoid allowing the puck to drop to the bottom of the table. The game begins with players shooting a puck into the table by holding the A button to launch it with a plunger. The longer the button is held, the harder the puck is launched. Players can also push a button to shake the in-game table, though if it is used too often, the flippers will be disabled and the puck will fall. There are various bonuses that players can experience during play. Some tables allow players to activate a "Bonus Roulette wheel", and some will allow them to get bonus points by collecting letters that spell the table's name. Bonus points will be awarded when a puck drops out of play, which varies depending on how long a puck was in play. Each table features a bonus puck to find. Players can collect stars, and upon collecting enough of them, they will be able to choose to go to a Bonus Stage or collect bonus points instead.

Development

The development of Galactic Pinball was managed by Gunpei Yokoi, who also created the Virtual Boy. It was directed by Kenji Yamamoto, who composed the sound alongside Masaru Tajima. It was shown during the Virtual Boy's Las Vegas debut alongside Teleroboxer. It has been known at varying points as Space Pinball, Virtual Pinball, and Pinball VB. It was one of the launch games for the Virtual Boy, and was released on July 21, 1995 in Japan and on August 14, 1995 in the United States. Like all Virtual Boy games, Galactic Pinball uses a red-and-black color scheme and parallax visuals to simulate three-dimensional depth.

Reception
Since its release, Galactic Pinball has received a mixed reception. Before its release, GamePro speculated that it might be "one of the best pinball games around." On release, Weekly Famicom Tsūshin scored the game a 24 out of 40, while GamePro reviewer Slo Mo praised the diversity of tables, responsive controls, and innovative 3D stage design. Writer Jeremy Parish called it a quality pinball game for its time and felt that it would have been a better pack-in title than Mario's Tennis. An editor for IGN called it one of the best Virtual Boy games for its pinball gameplay and visual design. Retro Gamers Nick Thorpe felt that it was less popular than other Virtual Boy games, but deserved to be played. Outlets including Videogames and Retro Gamer praised it for its authenticity as a pinball game. Specific praises include its physics and sound design. A writer for ABC's Good Game program also praised its authenticity, but felt that it lacked ambition. Venture Beat writer Jeff Grubb was more negative on Galactic Pinball, calling it a bad Virtual Boy game due to being low effort as a pinball game. Galactic Pinball was reviewed by two GameFan editors, both of whom were not enthused with it. The first reviewer found it forgettable for people not interested in pinball games, while the other suggested avoiding it. Allgame disliked Galactic Pinball, feeling that the slow pace and unrealistic physics hurt it as a pinball experience.

Outlets such as Electronic Entertainment and Nintendo Power praised the 3D design, the latter voting it the fourth best Virtual Boy game of 1995 due in part to the limited use of 3D. A reviewer for Nintendo Power however criticized  the limited 3D as well as a lack of a battery save for high scores. PC Magazines Benj Edwards included it among his list of seven "forgotten Nintendo Virtual Boy classics." He cites Yokoi's interest in the Virtual Boy's black space as a way to convey "infinite space behind the playfield," and speculates that this was the origin of Galactic Pinball. A writer for Electronic Gaming Monthly found the level design excellent but that the flippers were too slow to respond. Kill Screen writer Jon Irwin similarly criticized its physics, stating that slowdown occurred whenever the puck approached the flippers. He felt that the action and physics were better in the Space Pinball demo than the final release. Next Generation was critical of Galactic Pinball due to poor lasting value. Tim Stevens for Engadget criticized the sound effects, in particular the lack of sound for the puck. He speculated that it was due to the digital voice work taking up too much room on the cartridge.

See also
List of Virtual Boy games

Notes

References

1995 video games
Intelligent Systems games
Pinball video games
Virtual Boy games
Single-player video games
Video games developed in Japan
Video games scored by Kenji Yamamoto (composer, born 1964)